Lucca Farias Di Giuseppe (born 10 March 2000), commonly known as Lucca, is a Brazilian footballer who plays as a midfielder.

Career statistics

Club

Notes

References

2000 births
Living people
Brazilian footballers
Association football midfielders
UAE Pro League players
UAE First Division League players
Associação Portuguesa de Desportos players
Ituano FC players
Khor Fakkan Sports Club players
Al Urooba Club players
Fujairah FC players
Expatriate footballers in the United Arab Emirates
Brazilian expatriate sportspeople in the United Arab Emirates